Simon Andrew Hicks Mayo  (born 21 September 1958) is an English radio presenter and author who worked for BBC Radio from 1982 until 2022.

Mayo has presented across three BBC stations for extended periods. From 1986 to 2001 he worked for Radio 1, including a five-year stint on the Radio 1 Breakfast Show. From 2001 he presented on BBC Radio 5 Live: from his debut until 2009 on a daily afternoon programme, and since then until 2022 with Kermode and Mayo's Film Review on Fridays. Between January 2010 to December 2018 he was the presenter of Simon Mayo Drivetime on BBC Radio 2, for the final six months with co-host Jo Whiley. Since March 2021, Simon Mayo Drivetime has returned on Greatest Hits Radio.

In 2008, Mayo was recognised as the "Radio Broadcaster of the Year"  at the 34th annual Broadcasting Press Guild Awards, and the "Speech Broadcaster of the Year" at the Sony Radio Academy Awards, receiving the latter for his "ability to paint colourful pictures of location and event and his ability to bring the very best out of his guests, encouraging conversation and interaction between them while skilfully nudging and controlling them" and for being  "a master of light and shade, handling serious and lighter issues with aplomb."

Mayo is also a published author. His works include a book titled Confessions, based on the Confessions slot from his radio shows, and several fictional thrillers.

Early life
Mayo's parents, Derek Mayo (1929–2001) and Jill, were both schoolteachers. He attended St John's Primary School in Croydon, Surrey, the Arden School in Knowle (for one term), the independent Solihull School (where his nickname, according to a newspaper profile in 2008, was "Heinz", after the salad cream brand) and Worthing High School for Boys in West Sussex which was then a state grammar school for boys. He graduated from the University of Warwick in 1981, with a degree in History and Politics.

Early career
His mother had undertaken part-time work in radio, and having occasionally experienced it with her, Mayo had wanted to work as a studio manager. But as a result of a frequency deficiency in his left ear, he failed the required hearing test, and refocused his career on presenting. Mayo spent some time honing his skills at Southlands Hospital Radio, and then worked for five years as a presenter with BBC Radio Nottingham from 10:45am to 2pm, followed by Dennis McCarthy. With a Radio Nottingham colleague he developed a programme format called Globe Phone and sent it to Johnny Beerling, Head of Radio 1, who offered him a job.

He joined BBC Radio 1 in 1986, presenting a two-hour Saturday evening show from 7:30pm to 9:30pm. In October 1987 he progressed to the weekend early slots from 6am to 8am and then became presenter of the weekday evening show in January 1988, which went out from 7:30pm to 10pm. Five months later he was offered the BBC Radio 1 breakfast show, regarded as the most prestigious presentation job in UK radio.

Shows

BBC Radio 1

Breakfast

Mayo spent five years presenting Radio 1 Breakfast on BBC Radio 1. Throughout his tenure on the breakfast show, which was based on a "zoo" format, Mayo was joined by news anchor Rod McKenzie and by a sidekick weather and travel presenter: first Carol Dooley, then Sybil Ruscoe, Jackie Brambles, and Dianne Oxberry. Weather and travel news reader stand-ins include Mayo's Radio 1 colleague Lynn Parsons, Caron Keating (from Blue Peter and Songs of Praise), and Philippa Forrester (from CBBC). The show's producer was Ric Blaxill, who also made regular speaking contributions.

He started his first breakfast show by playing "Somewhere in My Heart" by Aztec Camera, which was preceded by a montage of previous breakfast show hosts and then Mayo himself saying 'It's me, Simon Mayo, good morning.'

The programme became known for various features, including On This Day in History, sound-tracked by a looped version of George Michael's "I Want Your Sex"; the long-running cryptic game The Identik-Hit Quiz, where Mayo and his co hosts would act out a short scene which cryptically led listeners to the title of a hit song; and his Confessions feature where members of the public sought absolution for their (often frivolous or humorous) "sins". Mayo had already presented the dilemma show Scruples for BBC television, and had joined his Radio 1 colleagues on the host roster for Top of the Pops. Both On This Day in History and Confessions spawned spin-off books.

Due to frequent plays from Mayo, several unlikely hit singles reached the UK charts, including "Kinky Boots" by Patrick Macnee and Honor Blackman; "Donald Where's Your Troosers?" by Andy Stewart; and "Always Look on the Bright Side of Life", sung and written by Eric Idle. For helping Monty Python have a hit with the latter – 13 years after it first appeared on the soundtrack to The Life of Brian – Idle presented Mayo with a model bare foot, in the style of the animated version which used to end the opening titles to the TV show.

Like all Radio 1's high-profile presenters of the time, Mayo would take his turn to spend a week in a coastal area of the UK during the Radio 1 Roadshows which ran for three months of the summer. For a short while, he also presented an additional weekend show for the station on a Sunday afternoon, provisionally titled O Solomon Mayo, to cover for the absent Phillip Schofield, who was working in the West End.

Mid-mornings
Mayo formally gave up the breakfast show in 1993, though he had been on an extended period of paternity leave when the announcement was made. His stand-in Mark Goodier was his replacement.

Mayo took over the station's mid morning slot in October 1993, where he remained until February 2001. In addition to this, in May 1994,  he presented Simon Mayo's Classic Years, where he played two hours of classic pop tunes. The show originally went out on a Sunday lunchtime from noon till 2pm, but in November 1994 went out from 10am till noon on Sundays. This lasted until October 1995.

In January 1997, Mayo made a brief return to the breakfast show for three weeks after Chris Evans was dismissed, but both Mayo and BBC Radio 1 ruled out the possibilities of a permanent return to the programme. On his first morning as breakfast stand-in, Mayo read out an email from a man who had emigrated to New Zealand four years earlier and had arrived back in the UK that morning, and was "delighted to hear you're still doing the breakfast show".

In 1999 Mayo broke a world record by broadcasting for 37 hours in aid of that year's Comic Relief.

Mayo remained on the mid-morning slot until he left BBC Radio 1 in 2001, seeing breakfast-show presenters Mark Goodier, Steve Wright, Chris Evans, Mark and Lard, Kevin Greening, Zoe Ball, and Sara Cox, come and go from the slot, but the slot went to Jo Whiley.

His final show was on Friday 16 February 2001, and before signing off, he said: "One of the reasons I'm not going to do a DLT is that I've nothing to complain about at all – though as I'll still be employed by the BBC it'd be a stupid thing to do. I always thought as a kid working at Radio 1 would be the most fun and the best place for any presenter to work and I still think that's true." His final track played on BBC Radio 1 was Ace of Spades by Motörhead.

BBC Radio 5 Live

In May 2001, after 15 years of broadcasting with BBC Radio 1, Mayo moved on to another national BBC station, BBC Radio 5 Live, to present an afternoon programme. He began broadcasting every weekday from 1pm to 4pm, where he remained until 18 December 2009. He was on air in 2001 when the 9/11 attacks took place in the United States, broadcasting live as the events unfolded.

The programme generally combined topical debates, interviews and reviews. It came live from Westminster each Wednesday for live coverage of Prime Minister's Questions, with discussion and debate afterwards with political correspondents and MPs. The programme also featured Mayo's former Radio 1 sidekick Mark Kermode reviewing the new movie releases each Friday afternoon. The banter between Mayo and Kermode in this section of the programme was described by both men as "wittertainment at its most wittertaining." (The neologism wittertainment is a portmanteau of witter and entertainment, and was coined in a – now deleted – Wikipedia entry. However, Kermode and Mayo took note of the article before its deletion and have since been using the term regularly to refer to their show.)

In a May 2008 interview with The Guardian, Mayo mentioned he "signed a contract for the next two years" and was uncertain whether he would still be at BBC Radio 5 Live when it moved to Salford. It was later confirmed that Mayo was to move to BBC Radio 2's drivetime slot, though he continued to host a weekly two-hour film review show, Kermode and Mayo's Film Review, on BBC Radio 5 Live with Kermode until April 2022. In May 2009, Mayo and Kermode won a Gold Sony Radio Award in the Speech Award category.

BBC Radio 2

In addition to his daily programme on BBC Radio 5 Live, from October 2001 to April 2007, Mayo hosted the Album Chart show each week for BBC Radio 2. Alongside this, on 2 January 2006, he presented The Ultimate Music Year for the station, where listeners got the chance to vote for their favourite year for music. He has also presented many Sold on Song projects, presented the Top 100 Albums and provided holiday cover for Johnnie Walker on Sundays. From April 2007 to April 2008 Mayo took over the Radio 2 Music Club every Monday night from 11:30pm to 12:30am.

In January 2010, Mayo took over from Chris Evans on the Drivetime show, noting he was "very lucky to be given a second chance in such a high-profile slot." The programme included a number of regular daily features including "Nigel's Recipes", "Confessions", "Homework Sucks" and "The Showstopper". Every Friday he hosted "All-Request Friday" where listeners rang the show and had their favourite song played on the radio after a short interview. The show ended on 4 May 2018 after eight years, as Mayo was to begin hosting a revamped drivetime show with co-host Jo Whiley from 14 May 2018. On 22 October that year, the station announced that Mayo would be leaving BBC Radio 2 altogether after a backlash against the change, with Whiley moving back to an evening slot. Their last show together aired on 20 December, with Mayo presenting his last show after 17 years with the station the following day.

As his opening theme Mayo used the 2003 recording by Jools Holland and Prince Buster of the 1948 song "Enjoy Yourself" by Carl Sigman and by Herb Magidson. Later editions of the show also used the popular 1950 hit version by Guy Lombardo and his Royal Canadians. Incidental music included "Light My Fire" by Edmundo Ros.

In May 2011, Mayo won a Sony Award for "Best Music Show" for his work and that of his team on the BBC Radio 2 drive time slot.

On 21 December 2018 Simon presented his last show on BBC Radio 2, it being an All Request Friday, which featured his jingles previously used on his drivetime show. The last song to be played was "Bring Me Sunshine" by Morecambe and Wise.

Scala Radio
On 4 March 2019 at 10am, Mayo presented the launch of a new classical music digital radio station, Scala Radio, where he was one of the lead presenters. He presented a daily mid-morning show for two years, until starting work for Greatest Hits Radio; he continues to present his Essential Albums show for Scala on Saturdays.

Greatest Hits Radio
Mayo returned to his Monday to Friday drivetime radio show on 15 March 2021 on Greatest Hits Radio, resurrecting many staples from his former BBC Radio 2 drivetime shows, including "Confessions", "Tunesday", "Nigel's Recipes" (Foodie Thursday, sponsored by Heinz), and "All-Request Friday". He also presents his Album Show on Sunday afternoons, commencing September 2020.

Other work

BBC Radio 4
Mayo presented Act Your Age, a panel game for BBC Radio 4, first broadcast on Radio 4 on 27 November 2008.

Television projects

Between 1995 and 1998 Mayo presented a TV version of Confessions, based on the hit feature from his BBC Radio 1 breakfast and mid-morning shows.

Starting in 1999 he was the original presenter of National Lottery game show Winning Lines on BBC1 until 2000 when he was replaced by Phillip Schofield in 2001.

In 2005 he presented a series The Big Dig on BBC TV about allotments in the Rhondda Valley contrasted with others in Highgate, London.

Mayo hosted a revival of the classic quiz show Blockbusters, which began airing on Challenge on 14 May 2012 until 3 August 2012.

He was the announcer for the concert celebrating Queen Elizabeth II's Diamond Jubilee on 4 June 2012.

Books

Confessions, based on the hit feature from his BBC Radio 2 drivetime show, and his former BBC Radio 1 breakfast and mid-morning shows. was released in October 2011. The book is a compilation of the best confessions sent to the show by listeners.

Mayo's debut novel, Itch, was released on 1 March 2012. The titular protagonist is a fourteen-year-old boy who discovers a previously unknown chemical element. The Guardian called it 'a great and thrilling book with an easy to read storyline that will help kids to understand elements!' His second novel Itch Rocks was released in February 2013 and the third instalment, Itchcraft, came out in September 2014.

His first young adult novel, Blame, was published in July 2016.

Mayo's first novel for adults, Mad Blood Stirring, was published in April 2018 and received mixed reviews. It is a historical novel set in Dartmoor Prison in 1815. Clare Clarke, for The Guardian, said: "With its huge, amorphous cast and little interior characterisation, its pages rich with Shakespeare’s poetry and the rousing gospel music for which Block 4 was reputedly renowned, the dialogue-heavy Mad Blood Stirring reads more like a first-draft film treatment than a finished novel. Mayo has served up all the ingredients he could find, but longer cooking would have given it greater depth and subtlety of flavour." The novelist John Boyne said:  "Bristling with energy, written with passion, Mad Blood Stirring is a joy to read."

In 2020 Knife Edge, a first thriller for Mayo, was published. Its setting is drawn from his experiences when an undergraduate at Warwick University, and the denouement is in the neighbouring city of Coventry. The book was promoted as a Sunday Times Top 10 bestseller. Tick Tock, a thriller based on a mysterious global illness, was published in 2022.

Radio credits
 BBC Radio Nottingham – The Simon Mayo Show 10:45am2pm, 19821986
 BBC Radio 1:
  Saturday evenings 7:30pm9:30pm, 19861987
  Weekend early mornings 6am8am, late 1987
  MondayThursday evenings 7:30pm10pm, JanuaryMay 1988
  Breakfast Show 6am9am, May 1988September 1993
  Mid Morning Show 9am12 noon, October 1993February 2001
 BBC Radio 5 Live:
   Afternoon Show 1pm4pm, May 2001December 2009
 Kermode and Mayo's Film Review Friday 2pm4pm, January 2010May 2019; 3pm5pm, May 2019March 2020, August 2021February 2022; 2:30pm4pm, March 2020August 2021, February 2022April 2022
 BBC Radio 2:
  Album Chart Show Monday evenings 7pm8pm, October 2001April 2007
  Music Club Monday nights/Tuesday overnight 11:30pm12:30am, April 2007April 2008
  Drivetime Monday – Friday 5pm7pm, 11 January 20104 May 2018
 Jo Whiley & Simon Mayo – Monday – Thursday 5pm8pm; Friday 5pm7pm, 14 May 2018 21 December 2018
 BBC Radio 4 – Act Your Age 6:30pm, NovemberDecember 2008
 Scala Radio:
  Monday – Saturday mid-mornings 10am1pm, 4 March 201926 February 2021
  Essential Albums. Saturdays 3pm5pm, 3 April 2021 – present
 Greatest Hits Radio:
  Album Show. Sundays 1pm4pm, 6 September 2020 – present
  Drivetime Monday – Friday 4pm7pm, 15 March 2021 – present

Personal life 
While at university, he was a presenter on the student radio station, Radio Warwick. In 2005 the university awarded him an honorary Doctor of Letters.

Mayo is married to Hilary Bird, who had worked at Radio Nottingham since 1984 on Action Line, and also worked for BBC Radio 2 as a producer for Canon Roger Royle and later Don Maclean on Good Morning Sunday from 1987 to 1990. The wedding took place on Saturday 11 October 1986 at St Helen's Church in Burton Joyce, Nottinghamshire. They have two sons and a daughter. Mayo is a supporter of Tottenham Hotspur, and lives in London.

Mayo was appointed Member of the Order of the British Empire (MBE) in the 2021 Birthday Honours for services to broadcasting.

References

External links

 
  The Simon Mayo Drivetime Show on Greatest Hits Radio (Greatest Hits Radio)
 Simon Mayo: All Request Friday on Greatest Hits Radio (Greatest Hits Radio)
 Simon Mayo's Essential Albums on Scala Radio (Scala Radio)
 Simon Mayo: The Album Show on Greatest Hits Radio (Greatest Hits Radio)
 Kermode and Mayo's Take Official Website
 Simon Mayo from Radio Rewind's website

1958 births
Living people
Alumni of the University of Warwick
BBC Radio 1 presenters
BBC Radio 2 presenters
BBC Radio 5 Live presenters
British radio DJs
British writers
English radio personalities
People educated at Solihull School
People educated at Worthing High School
Members of the Order of the British Empire
Top of the Pops presenters